England women and New Zealand women played against each other for the first time on 13 August 1997 at Burnham, New Zealand. The Black Ferns ran in ten tries against a scoreless England in their 67–0 victory. The Red Roses recorded their first win against the Black Ferns on 16 June 2001 at North Harbour Stadium, Albany; they won 17–22.

They have played 30 times, New Zealand winning 19 games, England ten, with a draw between them. New Zealand played their 100th test match on 31 October 2021, they were defeated 43–12 by England at Sandy Park.

England and New Zealand have met at the Rugby World Cup on six separate occasions. Once in the semi-final, at the 1998 World Cup in Amsterdam, and five times in the final at the 2002, 2006, 2010, 2017 and the recent delayed 2021 Rugby World Cup.

Summary

Results

References

External links 

 Results Summary at stats.allblacks.com

England women's national rugby union team
New Zealand women's national rugby union team